More than This: The Best of Bryan Ferry and Roxy Music is a 1995 compilation album covering Roxy Music and the solo career of the group's lead singer, Bryan Ferry. The name of the album is taken from the song "More than This" from the 1982 Roxy Music album Avalon.

UK release

Track listing
All songs written by Bryan Ferry except where noted.
 Roxy Music: "Virginia Plain" – 2:56 (from Roxy Music, 1972)
 Bryan Ferry: "A Hard Rain's A-Gonna Fall" (Bob Dylan) – 4:15 (from These Foolish Things, 1973)
 Roxy Music: "Street Life" – 3:29 (from Stranded, 1973)
 Bryan Ferry: "These Foolish Things" (Eric Maschwitz, Jack Strachey) – 4:49 (from These Foolish Things, 1973)
 Roxy Music: "Love Is the Drug" (Ferry, Andy MacKay) – 4:07 (from Siren, 1975)
 Bryan Ferry: "Smoke Gets in Your Eyes" (Jerome Kern, Otto Harbach) – 2:53 (from Another Time, Another Place, 1974)
 Roxy Music: "Dance Away" – 3:44 (from Manifesto, 1979)
 Bryan Ferry: "Let's Stick Together" (Wilbert Harrison) – 2:59 (from Let's Stick Together, 1976)
 Roxy Music: "Angel Eyes" (Ferry, Mackay) – 2:51 (from Manifesto, 1979)
 Bryan Ferry: "Slave to Love" – 4:17 (from Boys and Girls, 1985)
 Roxy Music: "Oh Yeah" – 4:36 (from Flesh and Blood, 1980)
 Bryan Ferry: "Don't Stop the Dance" (Ferry, Rhett Davies) – 4:20 (from Boys and Girls, 1985)
 Roxy Music: "Same Old Scene" – 3:58 (from Flesh + Blood, 1980)
 Bryan Ferry: "Is Your Love Strong Enough?" – 4:56 (from the film soundtrack to Legend, 1986)
 Roxy Music: "Jealous Guy" (John Lennon) – 4:56 (from the single Jealous Guy", 1981)
 Bryan Ferry: "Kiss and Tell" – 3:59 (from Bête Noire, 1987)
 Roxy Music: "More than This" – 4:10 (from Avalon, 1982)
 Bryan Ferry: "I Put a Spell on You" (Screamin' Jay Hawkins) – 3:54 (from Taxi, 1993)
 Roxy Music: "Avalon" – 4:16 (from Avalon, 1982)
 Bryan Ferry: "Your Painted Smile" – 3:13 (from Mamouna, 1994)

Japanese release
In 1997, More Than This was also released in Japan. The track listing was slightly different, as "I Put a Spell on You" was replaced by "Tokyo Joe".

American release
In 1999 there was also an American release, again with a different track listing. The Bryan Ferry song "I'm in the Mood for Love" was added and both "Is Your Love Strong Enough?" and "Your Painted Smile" were left out.

Certifications

References

1995 compilation albums
Bryan Ferry albums
Roxy Music compilation albums
Virgin Records compilation albums